Ricardo García Mercet (16 August 1860 – 12 May 1933 was a Spanish naturalist and entomologist.

He was a pharmacist attached to the Spanish military. At various times he was a member of the Spanish Royal Academy of Sciences, President of  Sociedad Española de Historia Natural (Spanish society of Natural history); Secretary general of Asociación Española para el Progreso de las Ciencias (Spanish Association for the progress of science) and an Honorary Member of the entomological societies of Egypt and Chile.

His collections of Chalcidoidea are conserved in Museo Nacional de Ciencias Naturales in Madrid and the Natural History Museum of Giacomo Doria in Genoa.

Works
1921 Fauna ibérica Himenópteros, fam. encírtidos Madrid :Museo Nacional de Ciencias Naturales

References
Poggi, R.; Conci, C. 1996: [Mercet Garcia, R.]  Mem. Soc. Ent. Ital., Genova 75 :73
Viejo Montesinos, J. L. 1998: [Mercet Garcia, R.] Memorias de la Real Sociedad Española de Historia Natural 1 122-134

External links
 

Spanish entomologists
1933 deaths
1860 births